José Ricardo Galindo Gutiérrez (born 13 January 1998) is a Mexican professional footballer who plays as a centre-back for Liga MX club UNAM.

Career statistics

Club

References

External links
 

Living people
1998 births
Mexican footballers
Association football midfielders
Club Universidad Nacional footballers
Liga MX players
Liga de Expansión MX players